The 1971 Men's South American Volleyball Championship, the 9th tournament, took place in 1971 in Montevideo.

Final positions

Mens South American Volleyball Championship, 1971
Men's South American Volleyball Championships
1971 in South American sport
1971 in Uruguayan sport
International volleyball competitions hosted by Uruguay